The Castle of Sant'Aniceto (also San Niceto) is a Norman castle built in the early 11th century on a hill in Motta San Giovanni, now in the province of Reggio Calabria, southern Italy.

It is one of the few examples of High Middle Ages architecture in Calabria, as well as one of the few well-preserved Byzantine fortifications in the world. The name derives from that of St. Nicetas, a Byzantine admiral who lived in the 7th-8th centuries.

History
The castle is a Norman building built in the early 11th century on a hill in Motta San Giovanni.

In the 13th century the castle became the command center of the flourishing fief of Sant'Aniceto (which included Motta San Giovanni and Montebello). Two centuries later, entered in conflict with Reggio Calabria, and in 1459 it was destroyed by Alfonso of Calabria.

Architecture
The castle has an irregular plan, which reminds that of a ship with the bow directed towards the mountains and the aft to the sea.

Nest to the entrance are two square towers. At the feet of the short steep path leading to the plain below is a small church, which has a frescoed dome portraying the Christ Pantokrator, a typical subject of Byzantine Art.

The height of the well-preserved walls varies from 3 to 3.5 meters, and they are some one meters thick.

References

Buildings and structures completed in the 11th century
Sant'Aniceto
Buildings and structures in the Province of Reggio Calabria
Byzantine forts
Tourist attractions in Calabria